The Lebanese football league system, also known as the Lebanese football pyramid, is a series of interconnected leagues for men's association football clubs in Lebanon. The system has a hierarchical format with promotion and relegation between leagues at different levels, allowing even the smallest club the theoretical possibility of ultimately rising to the very top of the system. There are five individual leagues, containing more than 20 divisions.

The exact number of clubs varies from year to year as clubs join and leave leagues, fold or merge altogether, but an estimated average of 9 clubs per division implies that about 200 clubs are members of a league in the Lebanese men's football league system.

Structure

Men
The first tier of Lebanese football is the Lebanese Premier League, which is governed by the Lebanese Football Association and is made up of 12 teams. Next is the Lebanese Second Division. Both of these leagues cover the whole of Lebanon. The third tier is the Lebanese Third Division; it has four groups (of seven clubs each) which are generally split on the basis of location. The first three leagues participate in the Lebanese FA Cup, the national domestic cup competition.

At the fourth tier is the Lebanese Fourth Division, a league of five parallel divisions (in which the clubs are divided by geographical location). Finally, at the end of the pyramid is the Lebanese Fifth Division, composed of three divisions also split on the basis of location.

If teams are level on points, tie-breakers are applied in the following order:
 Head-to-head records (results and points)
 Goal difference of head-to-head games
 Goal difference overall
 Higher number of goals scored
 Draw

Women
The women's system is divided into only one level.

See also
 League system, for a list of similar systems in other countries
 List of association football competitions
 Football in Lebanon
 List of football clubs in Lebanon
 List of top-division football clubs in AFC countries

References

 
Football league systems in Asia